Distillation is a method of separating mixtures based on differences in their volatilities in a boiling liquid mixture.

Distillation may also refer to:

Chemistry 
 Azeotropic distillation
 Batch distillation
 Continuous distillation
 Destructive distillation
 Dry distillation
 Entanglement distillation
 Extractive distillation
 Fractional distillation
 Multi-stage flash distillation
 Reactive distillation
 Salt-effect distillation
 Spinning band distillation
 Steam distillation
 Vacuum distillation

Computer science 
 Distillation (machine learning)

Environmental science 
 Global distillation, the process by which chemicals such as pollutants are transported from warmer to colder regions of the Earth

Publications 
 Distillation Design
 Distillations (magazine), a magazine published by the Science History Institute

Music 
 Distillation (Erin McKeown album), 2000
 Distillation (Wishbone Ash album), 1997

See also
 
 
 Distiller (disambiguation)
 Distillery (disambiguation)